Farndale is a surname, and may refer to:

 Jamie Farndale (born 1994), Scottish rugby union player 
 Joseph Farndale (1864–1954), British police officer
 Martin Farndale (1929–2000), British Army officer
 Nigel Farndale (born 1964), British author and journalist

See also
 Farndale in Yorkshire, England